Pfenninger is a surname. Notable people with the surname include:

Fritz Pfenninger (1934–2001), Swiss cyclist
Hans Pfenninger (1929–2009), Swiss cyclist
Louis Pfenninger (born 1944), Swiss racing cyclist
Matthias Pfenninger (1739–1813), Swiss artist
Otto Pfenninger (1855–1929), Swiss photographer